Hematite, also spelled as haematite, is a common iron oxide compound with the formula, Fe2O3 and is widely found in rocks and soils. It has the same crystal structure as corundum and ilmenite. With this it forms a complete solid solution at temperatures above .

Hematite naturally occurs in black to steel or silver-gray, brown to reddish-brown, or red colors. It is mined as an important ore mineral of iron. It is electrically conductive. Hematite varieties include kidney ore, martite (pseudomorphs after magnetite), iron rose and specularite (specular hematite). While these forms vary, they all have a rust-red streak. Hematite is not only harder than pure iron, but also much more brittle. Maghemite is a polymorph of hematite (γ-) with the same chemical formula, but with a spinel structure like magnetite.

Large deposits of hematite are found in banded iron formations. Gray hematite is typically found in places that have still, standing water or mineral hot springs, such as those in Yellowstone National Park in North America. The mineral can precipitate in the water and collect in layers at the bottom of the lake, spring, or other standing water. Hematite can also occur in the absence of water, usually as the result of volcanic activity.

Clay-sized hematite crystals can also occur as a secondary mineral formed by weathering processes in soil, and along with other iron oxides or oxyhydroxides such as goethite, which is responsible for the red color of many tropical, ancient, or otherwise highly weathered soils.

Etymology and history

The name hematite is derived from the Greek word for blood  (haima), due to the red coloration found in some varieties of hematite. The color of hematite is often used as a pigment. The English name of the stone is derived from Middle French hématite pierre, which was taken from Latin lapis haematites  the 15th century, which originated from Ancient Greek  (haimatitēs lithos, "blood-red stone").

Ochre is a clay that is colored by varying amounts of hematite, varying between 20% and 70%. Red ochre contains unhydrated hematite, whereas yellow ochre contains hydrated hematite (Fe2O3 · H2O). The principal use of ochre is for tinting with a permanent color.

The red chalk writing of this mineral was one of the earliest in the human history. The powdery mineral was first used 164,000 years ago by the Pinnacle-Point man, possibly for social purposes. Hematite residues are also found in graves from 80,000 years ago. Near Rydno in Poland and Lovas in Hungary red chalk mines have been found that are from 5000 BC, belonging to the Linear Pottery culture at the Upper Rhine.

Rich deposits of hematite have been found on the island of Elba that have been mined since the time of the Etruscans.

Magnetism
Hematite shows only a very feeble response to a magnetic field. Unlike magnetite, it is not noticeably attracted to an ordinary magnet.

It was shown that the system is essentially antiferromagnetic, but that the low symmetry of the cation sites allows spin–orbit coupling to cause canting of the moments when they are in the plane perpendicular to the c axis. In this configuration, spin canting does not reduce the energy. The magnetic properties of bulk hematite differ from their nanoscale counterparts. For example, the Morin transition temperature of hematite decreases with a decrease in the particle size. The suppression of this transition has been observed in hematite nanoparticles and is attributed to the presence of impurities, water molecules and defects in the crystals lattice. Hematite is part of a complex solid solution oxyhydroxide system having various contents of H2O (water), hydroxyl groups and vacancy substitutions that affect the mineral's magnetic and crystal chemical properties. Two other end-members are referred to as protohematite and hydrohematite.

Enhanced magnetic coercivities for hematite have been achieved by dry-heating a two-line ferrihydrite precursor prepared from solution. The origin of these high coercivity values has been interpreted as a consequence of the subparticle structure induced by the different particle and crystallite size growth rates at increasing annealing temperature. These differences in the growth rates are translated into a progressive development of a subparticle structure at the nanoscale (super small). At lower temperatures (350–600 °C), single particles crystallize. However, at higher temperatures (600–1000 °C), the growth of crystalline aggregates and a subparticle structure is favored.

Mine tailings
Hematite is present in the waste tailings of iron mines.  A recently developed process, magnetation, uses magnets to glean waste hematite from old mine tailings in Minnesota's vast Mesabi Range iron district. Falu red is a pigment used in traditional Swedish house paints. Originally, it was made from tailings of the Falu mine.

Mars

The spectral signature of hematite was seen on the planet Mars by the infrared spectrometer on the NASA Mars Global Surveyor and 2001 Mars Odyssey spacecraft in orbit around Mars. The mineral was seen in abundance at two sites on the planet, the Terra Meridiani site, near the Martian equator at 0° longitude, and the Aram Chaos site near the Valles Marineris. Several other sites also showed hematite, such as Aureum Chaos. Because terrestrial hematite is typically a mineral formed in aqueous environments or by aqueous alteration, this detection was scientifically interesting enough that the second of the two Mars Exploration Rovers was sent to a site in the Terra Meridiani region designated Meridiani Planum. In-situ investigations by the Opportunity rover showed a significant amount of hematite, much of it in the form of small "Martian spherules" that were informally named "blueberries" by the science team.  Analysis indicates that these spherules are apparently concretions formed from a water solution.
"Knowing just how the hematite on Mars was formed will help us characterize the past environment and determine whether that environment was favorable for life".

Jewelry
Hematite was once used as mourning jewelry. A 1923 reference describes "hematite is sometimes used as settings in mourning jewelry." Certain types of hematite- or iron-oxide-rich clay, especially Armenian bole, have been used in gilding. Hematite is also used in art such as in the creation of intaglio engraved gems. Hematine is a synthetic material sold as magnetic hematite.

Gallery

See also
Mill scale
Mineral redox buffer
Wüstite

References

External links

MineralData.org

Oxide minerals
Iron(III) minerals
Iron oxide pigments
Hematite group
Trigonal minerals
Minerals in space group 167
Iron ores
Magnetic minerals
Jewellery components
Symbols of Alabama